Agritopia is a 166-acre mixed use planned community in Gilbert, Arizona designed to encourage agrarianism combined with a sense of community among the socioeconomic ranges. It is an agrihood with housing plots, a certified organic farm, and commercial spaces. Homes range from 1300 square feet to 7000 square feet. Narrow streets and front porches, with low back fences, encourage neighborly socialization.

The neighborhood was developed by Joe Johnston in the 2000s on the site of his historic family farm. It contains 452 lots on which the developer built single family homes, cottages, and bungalows, all in neotraditional architectural styles popular in early 20th century America. The community also includes a functioning urban farm, a community garden, a private 470-student Christian school, a community center, a retirement home, and four restaurants. The developers established neighborhood covenants which encouraged home-based and agricultural businesses, and pedestrian transit, but discouraged rental housing.

Within Agritopia are currently two stand-alone restaurants. "Joe's Farm Grill" was featured on the Food Network's popular show "Diners, Drive-ins and Dives" hosted by Guy Fieri. Next to Joe's Farm Grill is "The Coffee Shop" which won an episode of Food Network's "Cupcake Wars". A set of buildings called "Barnone" features artisanal craftsmen selling their goods and making them onsite.

References

Further reading 
 

Gilbert, Arizona